Saint-Cyr-les-Champagnes is a commune in the Dordogne department in Nouvelle-Aquitaine in southwestern France. It has an 11th-12th century romanesque church, dedicated to Saint-Cyr and Sainte-Juliette.

Population

See also
Communes of the Dordogne department

References

Communes of Dordogne
Arrondissement of Nontron